The Dunn House in Hampton, Arkansas is an early 20th vernacular farmhouse.  The -story L-shaped wood-frame house was built in 1909 for the Dunn family, which continues to own the property.  It features a center gable dormer on the front facade, which includes a small eyebrow window, and a porch extending the width of the front supported by 18 Doric columns.

The house was listed on the National Register of Historic Places in 1976.

See also
National Register of Historic Places listings in Calhoun County, Arkansas

References

Houses on the National Register of Historic Places in Arkansas
Houses completed in 1909
Houses in Calhoun County, Arkansas
National Register of Historic Places in Calhoun County, Arkansas
1909 establishments in Arkansas
Hampton, Arkansas